Coma is a 2009 Austrian film written and directed by Ludwig Wüst.

The film premiered at the Moscow International Film Festival in 2009. It received critical acclaim particularly in the French Canadian press.

Due to his gloomy style director Ludwig Wüst is often compared with fellow Austrian directors Michael Haneke and Ulrich Seidl.

Coma is the first Austrian film and one of the first films in Europe that had a world-wide release on the internet as video on demand on the renowned cinema website mubi.com simultaneously with its theatrical release.

Plot

Hans, a taxi driver lives in a small town near Vienna. When he is turning 50 his wife arranges a party with friends. But as the guests gather Hans wanders off into the forest and does not attend the party. Meanwhile his son is watching snuff videos with his friend Richy. Richy brings him a DVD with a video that shows a woman almost being beaten to death. Mistakenly his mother finds the DVD and takes it as a birthday present for his father and wraps it. After Hans has eventually returned home that night he finds the DVD and is confronted with his violent past.

He leaves the family and drives to Germany where he pays a prostitute to get information about Gertrud, a woman with whom he was able to fully play out his sadomasochistic fantasies. He eventually finds her in a hospital. She is in a vegetative state and takes her to his new home to take care of her. The film finishes with a love scene between the two.

Critical reception 
Following the world premiere at the Moscow International Film Festival 2009 the film had excellent reviews around the world, especially in the Canadian press after its North American premiere at the Festival du Nouveau Cinéma in Montréal. Le Lien Multimedias Yves Tremblay noted:

Awards and Festivals 
Moscow International Film Festival (Competition)
Reykjavík International Film Festival (Competition)
Festival du Nouveau Cinéma (Competition)
Saarbrücken Film Festival Max Ophüls Preis (Spektrum)
Hof International Film Festival
Vienna International Film Festival 
Diagonale (Competition)
Split International Film Festival (Competition)
Nordkapp Film Festival
Tamil Nadu International Filmfestival: Best Film

References

External links
 
 
 Interview with director Ludwig Wüst

2009 films
2000s German-language films
2009 thriller films
Films set in Austria
Austrian independent films
Austrian thriller films
2009 independent films